National Highway 153B, commonly referred to as NH 153B is a national highway in  India. It is a spur road of National Highway 53. NH-153B traverses the state of Odisha in India.

Route 
Sarapal - Naktideul - Redhakhol - Bauda.

Junctions  

  Terminal near Sarapal.
  near Redhakhol
  Terminal near Bauda.

See also 

 List of National Highways in India
 List of National Highways in India by state

References

External links 

 NH 153B on OpenStreetMap

National highways in India
National Highways in Odisha